The 2011 Tetra Pak Tennis Cup was a professional tennis tournament played on clay courts. It was the first edition of the tournament which was part of the 2011 ATP Challenger Tour. It took place in Campinas, Brazil between 19 and 25 September 2011.

ATP entrants

Seeds

 1 Rankings are as of September 12, 2011.

Other entrants
The following players received wildcards into the singles main draw:
  Marcelo Demoliner
  Stefano Soares
  João Pedro Sorgi
  Francisco Zambon

The following players received entry from the qualifying draw:
  Martín Cuevas
  Fabiano de Paula
  Joaquín-Jesús Monteferrario
  Laurent Recouderc

Champions

Singles

 Máximo González def.  Caio Zampieri, 6–3, 6–2

Doubles

 Marcel Felder /  Caio Zampieri def.  Fabricio Neis /  João Pedro Sorgi, 7–5, 6–4

External links
ITF Search
ATP official site

 
Tetra Pak Tennis Cup
Clay court tennis tournaments